Jinhua Architecture Park (Chinese: t , s , p Jīnhuá Jiànzhù Yìshù Gōngyuán) is a park in Jinhua, a city in central Zhejiang province in eastern China.

History 
The park contains 17 specially designed pavilions by Chinese and international architects. The chief organizer and curator is Chinese designer and architect Ai Weiwei. Naihan Li served as the project coordinator. The project began in 2002.

Works

References

Further reading

Jinhua
Parks in Zhejiang
Tourist attractions in Zhejiang
Buildings and structures in Zhejiang
Ai Weiwei buildings
Wang Shu buildings